The United States Minor Outlying Islands is a statistical designation defined by the International Organization for Standardization's ISO 3166-1 code. The entry code is ISO 3166-2:UM. The minor outlying islands and groups of islands consist of eight United States insular areas in the Pacific Ocean (Baker Island, Howland Island, Jarvis Island, Johnston Atoll, Kingman Reef, Midway Atoll, Palmyra Atoll, and Wake Island) and one in the Caribbean Sea (Navassa Island).

History 
In 1936, a colonization program began to settle Americans on Baker, Howland, and Jarvis, but all three islands were evacuated in 1942 as a result of World War II.

ISO introduced the term "United States Minor Outlying Islands" in 1986. From 1974 until 1986, five of the islands (Baker Island, Howland Island, Jarvis Island, Palmyra Atoll, and Kingman Reef) were grouped under the term United States Miscellaneous Pacific Islands, with ISO 3166 code . Prior to 1986, Navassa Island, along with several small islands in the Caribbean Sea that are no longer under U.S. sovereignty, were grouped under the term United States Miscellaneous Caribbean Islands, with FIPS country code .

The populated Stewart Islands, called Sikaiana and now effectively controlled by the Solomon Islands, are not included in official lists of U.S. Minor Outlying Islands. In 1856, the Kingdom of Hawaii Privy Council and King Kamehameha IV voted to accept their voluntary cession.  The Kingdom later became the Republic of Hawaii, all of which was annexed by the United States in 1898.  In 1959, the resulting federal U.S. Territory of Hawaii, excluding only Palmyra Atoll and Midway Atoll, became a U.S. state. Residents of the Stewart Islands, who are Polynesian like the native Hawaiians rather than Melanesian, claimed to be citizens of the United States since the Stewart Islands were given to King Kamehameha IV in 1856 and were part of Hawaii at the time of the United States' annexation in 1898.  The U.S. federal and Hawaii state governments informally accept the recent claim of the Solomon Islands over the Stewart Islands, and the United States makes no official claim of sovereignty.

Overview 
Except for Palmyra Atoll, all of these islands are unincorporated unorganized territories of the United States. Currently, none of the islands have any permanent residents, although military personnel, U.S. Fish and Wildlife Service personnel, and temporarily stationed scientific and research staff are posted to some of the islands. The 2000 census counted 315 people on Johnston Atoll and 1 person on Wake Atoll. The Territory of Palmyra Atoll is an incorporated territory, separated in 1959 from the rest of the former incorporated Territory of Hawaii when Hawaii became a state.

There has been no modern indigenous population, except at the 1940 census. During the late 2010s, the U.S. military began reinvesting in the airfield and other assets on Wake Island.

The islands are grouped together as a statistical convenience. They are not administered collectively, nor do they share a single cultural or political history beyond being uninhabited islands under the sovereignty of the United States. They are all outside of the customs territory of the United States and have no customs duties.  Except for Midway Atoll, the Pacific islands are surrounded by large exclusive economic zones and are within the bounds of the Pacific Remote Islands Marine National Monument.

They are collectively represented by the ISO 3166-1 alpha-2 code UM. The individual islands have ISO 3166-2 numerical codes.

The Internet country code top-level domain (ccTLD) ".um" has historically been assigned to the islands; however, the .um ccTLD was retired in January 2007.

Most of the islands in the U.S. Minor Outlying Islands are closed to the public. Visitors to islands such as Jarvis Island need a permit. Palmyra Atoll is open to the public, but there is no easy way to reach it.

Transportation

Airports 

Airports in the United States minor outlying islands provide critical emergency landing points across the vast Pacific Ocean for all types of aircraft, allow for important military presence in key strategic zones, and have limited scheduled commercial services. The following is a list of island airports with ICAO (IATA) codes:

 PLPA: Palmyra (Cooper) Airport, Cooper Island, Palmyra Atoll 
 PMDY (MDY): Henderson Field, Sand Island, Midway Atoll
 PWAK (AWK): Wake Island Airfield, Wake Island

Other airports include:

 Johnston Atoll Airport, Johnston Atoll (Formerly PJON/JON): The airport was built during WWII, and saw significant commercial traffic during the second half of the 20th century. However, it was abandoned in 2003.
 Kamakaiwi Field: Howland Island (from 1937 to about 1945)
 Kingman Reef: The lagoon was used as a halfway station between Hawaii and American Samoa by Pan American Airways for flying boats in 1937 and 1938.

Seaports 
Three of the islands are listed with ports in the World Port Index, with World Port Number:

 56325 JOHNSTON ATOLL: Johnston Atoll
 56328 MIDWAY ISLAND: Midway Atoll
 56330 WAKE ISLAND: Wake Atoll
 not listed WEST LAGOON: Palmyra Atoll

Baker Island, Howland Island, and Jarvis Island each have a small boat landing place. Kingman Reef and Navassa Island have offshore anchorage only.

Islands and atolls

Flora and fauna 

 List of birds of the United States Minor Outlying Islands
 List of mammals of the United States Minor Outlying Islands
 List of plants of the United States Minor Outlying Islands

See also 
 Guano Islands Act
 Insular Cases
 List of airports by ICAO code: P
 List of territorial disputes
 New Zealand outlying islands
 Outlying Islands, Hong Kong
 United States Miscellaneous Caribbean Islands
 United States Miscellaneous Pacific Islands

References

External links 

 WorldStatesmen – U.S.
 Pacific Island Wildlife Refuges 
 CIA World Factbook: United States Pacific Island Wildlife Refuges

 
Dependent territories in North America
Dependent territories in Oceania
Insular areas of the United States